In Norse mythology, Skinfaxi and Hrímfaxi  are the horses of  Dagr (day) and Nótt (night). The names Skinfaxi and Hrímfaxi are bahuvrihi compounds, meaning "shining mane" and "rime mane" (or "frost mane"), respectively. Skinfaxi pulls Dagr's chariot across the sky every day and his mane lights up the sky and earth below.

The myth of Skinfaxi is believed to have originated in Nordic Bronze Age religion, for which there is strong evidence of beliefs involving a horse pulling the sun across the sky. The Trundholm sun chariot is drawn by a single horse, and was possibly imagined to be pulled back across the sky from west to east by a second horse. Related are Arvak and Alsvid, a team of two horses pulling the chariot of Sól. 

In the Codex Regius, Skinfaxi and Hrimfaxi are mentioned in verses 7 and 8 of the Vafþrúðnismál, during the battle of wits between Odin and (the jotun) Vafþrúðnir. This is the oldest extant manuscript which mentions these two horses.

See also
List of fictional horses
Gullfaxi
Shadowfax, a horse in J. R. R. Tolkien's Middle-earth
Skinfaxe (glacier)
Rimfaxe (glacier)

Horses in Norse mythology
Mythological duos